Leoline ("Leo") Williams (15 May 1900 – 29 February 1984) was an English cricketer active from 1919 to 1931 who played for Sussex and Gloucestershire. He was born in Wotton-under-Edge, Gloucestershire and died in Lower Sticker, Cornwall. He appeared in 43 first-class matches as a righthanded batsman who sometimes kept wicket. He scored 1,440 runs with a highest score of 107 and completed 20 catches with five stumpings.

Notes

1900 births
1984 deaths
English cricketers
British Army cricketers
Combined Services cricketers
Gloucestershire cricketers
Sussex cricketers
Indian Army cricketers